Nepal College of Information Technology, commonly known as NCIT, is an Engineering college in Nepal. It was established in the year 2000. Its campus is located at Balkumari, Lalitpur. The college currently offers Engineering and Management courses at the Bachelor's and Master's levels. It is affiliated with the Pokhara University.

Location
Nepal College of Information Technology (NCIT) is located at Balkumari, Lalitpur

Courses offered
The college offers courses in:
 Undergraduate programs:
 Bachelor of Engineering in Civil Engineering
 Bachelor of Engineering in Information Technology
 Bachelor of Engineering in Electronics and Communication Engineering
 Bachelor of Engineering in Computer Engineering
 Bachelor of Engineering in Software Engineering
 Business Administration (BBA)

 Postgraduate programs:
 Master of Engineering in Computer Engineering
 Master of Science in Computer Science
 Master in Computer Information System

Facilities
The College is also an authorized training partner of  CISCO, Red Hat, and Microsoft. It provides related trainings and conducts preparatory examinations leading to internationally recognized certifications from these  renowned institutions. NCIT has MoUs with the Microsoft  Innovation Center and many reputed multinational and local companies for internships and training programs.

References

External links
Official website

Educational institutions established in 2001
Engineering universities and colleges in Nepal
2001 establishments in Nepal